Judith "Judy" Roitman (born November 12, 1945) is a mathematician, a retired professor at the University of Kansas. She specializes in set theory, topology, Boolean algebras, and mathematics education.

Biography
Roitman was born in 1945 in New York City. She attended Oberlin College, followed by Sarah Lawrence College, graduating in 1966 with a degree in English literature. Next, she became interested in mathematical linguistics. As she had little formal mathematical education, Roitman started taking mathematics classes at the University of California, Berkeley and San Francisco State University. She had enjoyed mathematics as a high school student and found her interest renewed. In 1969 she started graduate studies in mathematics at Berkeley. During graduate school, she spent some time teaching mathematics in elementary schools as a Community Teaching Fellow with Project SEED. Roitman received her Ph.D. in 1974 from UC Berkeley with a thesis in topology; her thesis advisor was Robert M. Solovay. She taught at Wellesley College for three years, then spent a semester at the Institute for Advanced Study. She has been at the University of Kansas since then.

She has been involved in the field of mathematics education for much of her career, running workshops for elementary school teachers and high school teachers and observing them in the classroom. She has encouraged individual mathematicians and the mathematical community at large to get involved and take mathematics education more seriously. She was in the National Council of Teachers of Mathematics writing group that produced Principles and Standards for School Mathematics. Dismayed at the politicization of U.S. mathematics education, Roitman has insisted, "There is no math war."

Roitman has been active in the Association for Women in Mathematics since its early years, and she served as President for the term 1979–1981. She has been a Zen Buddhist since 1976, and is currently the guiding teacher of the Kansas Zen Center, of which she and her husband Stanley Lombardo were founding members.

Roitman is also a poet. Her poetry has appeared in a number of magazines, seven chapbooks, and two books.

Awards and honors
In 1996, she received the Louise Hay Award as recognition for her role as a math educator. In 2012 she became a fellow of the American Mathematical Society. In 2017, she was selected as a fellow of the Association for Women in Mathematics in the inaugural class.

Selected publications

Selected poetry

References

External links
 Roitman's Blog

1945 births
20th-century American mathematicians
21st-century American mathematicians
Living people
Educators from New York City
American Buddhists
American former Christians
American women educators
Sarah Lawrence College alumni
Set theorists
Topologists
University of California, Berkeley alumni
University of Kansas faculty
American Zen Buddhist spiritual teachers
Wellesley College faculty
Fellows of the American Mathematical Society
American women poets
20th-century American women writers
21st-century American women writers
20th-century American poets
21st-century American poets
Fellows of the Association for Women in Mathematics
American women mathematicians
20th-century women mathematicians
21st-century women mathematicians
Mathematicians from New York (state)